Nuevo Leon State Highway 58 ( NL 58 ) is a two-lane Nuevo Leon state highway. The highway connects Morales, Nuevo Leon with El Merendero, Nuevo Leon.

Mexican State Highways